The 2019 PDC Players Championship consisted of 30 darts tournaments on the 2019 PDC Pro Tour.

An increase from 22 to 30 Players Championship events saw an even more congested calendar in 2019. Also, following on from the lead of the European Tour, the semi-finals and final would increase in length from a best of 13 and best of 15 leg match respectively.

Prize money
The prize money for the Players Championship events remained at 2018 levels, with each event having a prize fund of £75,000.

This is how the prize money is divided:

February

Players Championship 1
Players Championship 1 was contested on Saturday 9 February 2019 at the Robin Park Tennis Centre in Wigan.

Players Championship 2
Players Championship 2 was contested on Sunday 10 February 2019 at the Robin Park Tennis Centre in Wigan.

Players Championship 3
Players Championship 3 was contested on Saturday 16 February 2019 at the Robin Park Tennis Centre in Wigan.  hit a nine-dart finish against .

Players Championship 4
Players Championship 4 was contested on Sunday 17 February 2019 at the Robin Park Tennis Centre in Wigan.

Players Championship 5
Players Championship 5 was contested on Saturday 23 February 2019 at the Barnsley Metrodome in Barnsley.  and  hit nine-dart finishes against  and  respectively.

Players Championship 6
Players Championship 6 was contested on Sunday 24 February 2019 at the Barnsley Metrodome in Barnsley.  hit a nine-dart finish against .

March

Players Championship 7
Players Championship 7 was contested on Saturday 16 March 2019 at the Robin Park Tennis Centre in Wigan.

Players Championship 8
Players Championship 8 was contested on Sunday 17 March 2019 at the Robin Park Tennis Centre in Wigan.

April

Players Championship 9
Players Championship 9 was contested on Saturday 6 April 2019 at the Barnsley Metrodome in Barnsley.  hit a nine-dart finish against .

Players Championship 10
Players Championship 10 was contested on Sunday 7 April 2019 at the Barnsley Metrodome in Barnsley.

Players Championship 11
Players Championship 11 was contested on Saturday 13 April 2019 at the Barnsley Metrodome in Barnsley.  hit a nine-dart finish against .

Players Championship 12
Players Championship 12 was contested on Sunday 14 April 2019 at the Barnsley Metrodome in Barnsley.

Players Championship 13
Players Championship 13 was contested on Tuesday 30 April 2019 at the Barnsley Metrodome in Barnsley.

May

Players Championship 14
Players Championship 14 was contested on Wednesday 1 May 2019 at the Barnsley Metrodome in Barnsley.

Players Championship 15
Players Championship 15 was contested on Saturday 18 May 2019 at the Barnsley Metrodome in Barnsley.  hit a nine-dart finish against .

Players Championship 16
Players Championship 16 was contested on Sunday 19 May 2019 at the Barnsley Metrodome in Barnsley.  hit a nine-dart finish against .

June

Players Championship 17
Players Championship 17 was contested on Saturday 22 June 2019 at the Robin Park Tennis Centre in Wigan.

Players Championship 18
Players Championship 18 was contested on Sunday 23 June 2019 at the Robin Park Tennis Centre in Wigan.

July

Players Championship 19
Players Championship 19 was contested on Tuesday 16 July 2019 at the Barnsley Metrodome in Barnsley.  hit a nine-dart finish against .

Players Championship 20
Players Championship 20 was contested on Wednesday 17 July 2019 at the Barnsley Metrodome in Barnsley.

August

Players Championship 21
Players Championship 21 was contested on Saturday 3 August 2019 at Halle 39 in Hildesheim.

Players Championship 22
Players Championship 22 was contested on Sunday 4 August 2019 at Halle 39 in Hildesheim.

September

Players Championship 23
Players Championship 23 was contested on Tuesday 10 September 2019 at the Barnsley Metrodome in Barnsley.

Players Championship 24
Players Championship 24 was contested on Wednesday 11 September 2019 at the Barnsley Metrodome in Barnsley.  hit a nine-dart finish against .

Players Championship 25
Players Championship 25 was contested on Saturday 21 September 2019 at the Barnsley Metrodome in Barnsley.  hit a nine-dart finish against .

Players Championship 26
Players Championship 26 was contested on Sunday 22 September 2019 at the Barnsley Metrodome in Barnsley.  hit a nine-dart finish against .

October

Players Championship 27
Players Championship 27 was contested on Friday 4 October 2019 at the Citywest Hotel in Dublin.

Players Championship 28
Players Championship 28 was contested on Saturday 5 October 2019 at the Citywest Hotel in Dublin.  hit a nine-dart finish against .

Players Championship 29
Players Championship 29 was contested on Monday 14 October 2019 at the Barnsley Metrodome in Barnsley.

Players Championship 30
Players Championship 30 was contested on Tuesday 15 October 2019 at the Barnsley Metrodome in Barnsley.  hit a nine-dart finish against .

References

2019 in darts
2019 PDC Pro Tour